Actinopus hirsutus is a species of mygalomorph spider in the family Actinopodidae. It can be found in Brazil.

The specific name hirsutus is a Latin adjective meaning hairy.

References 

hirsutus

Spiders by country